Back to the Blues may refer to:

 Back to the Blues (Gary Moore album), 2001
 Back to the Blues (Dinah Washington album), 1963